Paddys River may refer to:

Locality
 Paddys River, New South Wales, a locality in the Southern Highlands of New South Wales, Australia

Waterways
 Paddys River (Australian Capital Territory), flows into the Cotter River
 Paddys River (Southern Highlands, New South Wales), which flows through the Southern Highlands of New South Wales
 Paddys River (South West Slopes, New South Wales), which flows through the South West Slopes of New South Wales